The Kitchener Dutchmen were a Canadian junior ice hockey team based in Kitchener, Ontario, Canada.  They played in the Mid-Western division of the Greater Ontario Junior Hockey League.

History

The Kitchener Dutchmen franchise was founded in 1956 when the Junior A Kitchener Canucks were moved to become the Peterborough Petes.  With the Canucks gone, the new Kitchener Greenshirts were founded as members of the Central Junior B Hockey League to fill the void left by their Junior A counterparts.

The Greenshirts changed their name to the "Ranger B's" in 1969 to better reflect their relationship with their parent club, the Kitchener Rangers who entered the market in 1963.  The team started in the Central Junior B league, but as part of the 1971 geographic realignment, moved to the Western Junior B league.  In 1973, the team joined the "Southwestern Junior "B" Hockey League", which became the "Waterloo-Wellington Junior "B" Hockey League" and then the Midwestern "B" in 1977.  The team is a long-standing member of the league and remains there to this day as the Kitchener Dutchmen.

An original charter member team, in 1992 the franchise became the first team in Mid-Western "B" history, other than the Waterloo Siskins and the Stratford Cullitons, to win the league and the Sutherland Cup.  They won a second consecutive league title in 1993, but failed to come away with another Ontario Hockey Association title.  The team has not missed the playoffs since 1979, a streak only surpassed by the Siskins and Cullitons.  The Dutchmen are a long time farm team for the Kitchener Rangers of the Ontario Hockey League.

On April 26th, 2020, it was announced that the OHA had given approval for the Ayr Centennials to purchase the Dutchmen and move them to Ayr in order to promote the Centennials from Junior C to Junior B, effective starting in the 2020-21 season. This thus brought an end to the 63 years of Dutchmen hockey in Kitchener.

Season-by-season record

Sutherland Cup appearances

1965: Kitchener Greenshirts defeated Etobicoke Indians 4-games-to-2
1967: Kitchener Greenshirts defeated Dixie Beehives 4-games-to-2
1992: Kitchener Dutchmen defeated Milton Merchants 4-games-to-1
1993: Barrie Colts defeated Kitchener Dutchmen 4-games-to-none

George S. Dudley Trophy Super "C" appearances
1971: Woodstock Navy-Vets defeated Kitchener Ranger B's 4-games-to-2
1973: Woodstock Navy-Vets defeated Kitchener Ranger B's 4-games-to-3 with 1 tie

Notable alumni

Chris Ahrens
Jerry Byers
Jonathan Cheechoo
Dave Cressman
Jack Egers
Mike Hoffman
Jim Krulicki
Gary Kurt
Don Maloney
Joe McDonnell
Rich Peverley
Mike Robitaille
Mark Scheifele
Danny Seguin
Scott Stevens
Walt Tkaczuk
Scott Walker
Bennett Wolf

References

External links
Dutchmen Webpage

Ice hockey teams in Ontario
Sport in Kitchener, Ontario